This is a list of women artists who were born in the Nigeria or whose artworks are closely associated with that country.

A 
 Haneefah Adam, visual artist
 Jenevieve Aken (born 1989), photographer focused on self-portraits, portrait, and documentary photos
 Peju Alatise (born 1975), artist, poet, writer
 Ruby Onyinyechi Amanze (born 1982), Nigerian-born British-American drawings and works on paper, she lives in Brooklyn, New York

B 
 Olawunmi Banjo (born 1985), painter, drawing

C 
 Sokari Douglas Camp (born 1958), Nigerian-born English sculptor 
 Chinwe Chukwuogo-Roy (1952–2012), Nigerian-born English figurative painter
 Njideka Akunyili Crosby (born 1983), Nigerian-born visual artist, lives in Los Angeles

D 
 Nike Davies-Okundaye (born 1951), batik and adire textile designer
 Ndidi Dike (born 1960), English-born Nigerian sculpture and mixed-media painter

E 
 Afi Ekong (1930–2009), painter, fashion designer and member of the royal family of Edidem Bassey Eyo Epharaim Adam III
 Oroma Elewa, visual and performance artist, writer and creative director
 Ekene Emeka Maduka (born 1996), Canadian-Nigerian contemporary artist known for her self portraits

F 
 Modupeola Fadugba (born 1985), painter

K 
 Ayobola Kekere-Ekun (born 1993), contemporary visual artist
 Marcia Kure (born 1970), mixed media painter and drawer
 Ladi Kwali ( c.1925–1984), potter

L 
 Peju Layiwola (born 1967), visual artist, art historian, and professor

O 
 Toyin Ojih Odutola (born 1985), Nigerian-born American known for her multimedia drawings and works on paper
 Temitayo Ogunbiyi (born 1984), contemporary artist and curator
 Suzanna Ogunjami, painter, printmaker, jewelry designer; first African woman to have a solo exhibit in a commercial gallery in the United States
 Amarachi Okafor (born 1977), sculptor, mixed media artist
 Nnenna Okore (born 1975), Australian-born American textile artist and sculptor, of Nigerian descent
 Ebele Okoye (born 1969), Nigerian-born German painter, animator
 Adéọlá Ọlágúnjú, photographer, video artist, sound and installation artist
 Princess Elizabeth Olowu (born 1939), sculptor, daughter of Oba Akenzua II

T 
 Patience Torlowei (born 1964), fashion designer
 Fatimah Tuggar (born 1967), interdisciplinary artist

W 
 Susanne Wenger  (1915–2009), Austrian-born Nigerian sculptor

See also 
 List of Nigerians
 List of Nigerian artists

-
Nigerian
Artists
Artists, women